Ena Thomas (5 June 1935 – 5 July 2020) was a Welsh television chef. She came from Carmarthenshire, and was known as the chef on the 1990s Welsh-language television programme Heno (Tonight).

She published a number of Welsh-language cookery books, including Coginio Cartref Ena (Ena's Home Cooking) (1999) and Blas ar Fywyd (Taste of Life) (2012).

Thomas died on 5 July 2020, aged 85.

References

Welsh chefs
Welsh television presenters
British television chefs
Welsh women television presenters
1935 births
2020 deaths
People from Swansea
Place of death missing